Self-gravity is the gravitational force exerted on a body(s), by the body(s) that allows it to be held together. Self-gravity has effects in the fields of astronomy, physics, seismology, geology, and oceanography. Self-gravity differs with regards to the physical behaviour on large scale (planet size or larger) objects, such as the oceans on Earth or the rings of Saturn. Lynden-Bell, a British theoretical astrophysicist, constructed the equation for calculating the effects of self gravitation. The equation's main purpose is to give exact descriptions of models for rotating flattened globular clusters. It is also used in understanding how clusters of stars interact with each other. Self-gravity deals with large-scale observations in fields outside of astronomy as well. Self-gravity does not typically appear as the central focus of scientific research, but understanding it and being able to include its effects mathematically increases the accuracy of models and understanding large-scale systems.

Astronomy 

Self-gravity must be taken into account by astronomers because the bodies being dealt with are large enough to have gravitational effects on each other and within themselves. Self-gravity affects bodies passing each other in space within the sphere defined by the Roche limit because relatively small bodies could be torn apart by differential attraction. Though typically the effects of self-gravitation keep the smaller body intact because the smaller body becomes elongated and the gravity of the body can overcome the momentum from this interaction. This has been demonstrated on Saturn because the rings are a function of inter-particle self-gravity. Self-gravity is also necessary to understand quasi-stellar object discs, accretion disc formation, and stabilizing these discs around quasi-stellar objects. Self-gravitational forces are significant in the formation of planetesimals, and indirectly the formation of planets, which is critical to understanding how planets and planetary systems form and develop over time. Self-gravity applies to a range of scales, from the formation of rings around individual planets to the formation of planetary systems.

Seismology 

Self-gravity has implications in the field of seismology because the Earth is large enough that it can have elastic waves that can change the gravity within the Earth as the waves interact with large-scale subsurface structures. Some models depend on the use of the spectral element method, which take into account the effects of self-gravitation because it can have a large influence on results for certain receiver-source configurations and creates complications in the wave equation, particularly for long period waves. This kind of accuracy is critical in developing accurate 3-D crustal models in a spherical body (Earth) in the field of seismology, which allows for more accurate and higher-quality interpretations to be drawn from data. The influence of self-gravity (and gravity) alters the importance of Primary (P) and Secondary (S) waves in seismology because when gravity is taken into account, the effects of the S wave become less significant than they would without.

Oceanography 

Self-gravity is influential in understanding the sea level and ice caps for oceanographers and geologists, which is particularly important for anticipating the effects of climate change. The deformation of the Earth from the forces on the oceans can be calculated if the Earth is treated as fluid and the effects of self-gravity are taken into account. This has also allowed for the influence of ocean tide loading to be taken into account when observing the Earth's deformation response to harmonic surface loading. The results of calculating post-glacial sea levels near the ice caps are significantly different when using a flat Earth model that does not take self-gravity into account, as opposed to a spherical Earth where self-gravity is taken into account because of the sensitivity of the data in these regions, which shows how results can drastically change when self-gravity is ignored. There has also been research done to better understand Laplace's Tidal Equations to try to understand how the deformation of the Earth and self-gravity within the ocean affect the M2 tidal constituent (the tides dictated by the Moon). There have been suggestions that if the Greenland ice complex melts, the sea level will actually fall around Greenland and rise in areas further away because of the effects of self-gravity .

See also 
 Chamberlin–Moulton planetesimal hypothesis

References 

Gravity